Muhammad Bin Al-Qāsim al-Qundūsi (born c. 1790 – died 1861) was an Algerian Sufi calligrapher and scholar who was born in Qanaadasa in southwest Algeria.

Biography 

Al-Qundusi was born in Qanaadasa in 1790 in southwest Algeria. In 1828, he migrated to Fes, where he lived and had a hanout in the herb market, in which he sold herbs.

He lived in relative obscurity, though those who knew him described him as gnostic, saintly, esoterically knowledgeable, and spiritually insightful.

He wrote many books and transcribed a number of dawawin, or collected works. He conferred upon the Moroccan Alawite Sultan Sliman a degree in knowledge of the Dala'il al-Khayrat, a seminal Sufi text composed by the 15th-century Muhammad al-Jazuli. al-Qundusi passed away in 1861.

He was a Sufi associated with the Qadiri and Nasiri orders.

Calligraphy 
He was a talented calligrapher, specializing in a flamboyant style of the Maghrebi script that he innovated. He also created a copy of the Quran in 12 volumes which he finished on September 7–8, 1850, and which is kept in al-Khizāna al-Ḥassania.

He drew the name of Allah in the Zawiya of Idriss II in Fes.

Works 
His works include:

 التأسيس في مساوي الدنيا ومهاوي إبليس. completed 1838
 البوارق الأحمدية في الحركة والسكونية
 الصلاة الوافية من الأحوال الظلمانية
 التلوين والتمكين في مطلع الصلاة على صاحب الوحي المبين completed 1852
 The Drink of the People of Purity in Prayers upon the Chosen Prophet (or شراب أهل الصفا في الصلاة على النبي المصطفى), also known as طريق المعراج إلى حضرة صاحب التاج completed in 1838
The Grand Elixir of Invocations سيف العناية لمريد الكفاية
 تقاييد في الاسم اللطيف
 مختصر في أسماء الله الحسنى

Legacy 
Most of his works are now kept at the national library in Rabat.

His works inspired a typeface called Qandus, which was designed by Kristyan Sarkis of TPTQ Arabic, and won the Type Directors Club's 2017 Typeface Design Award.

References 

1861 deaths
People from Kénadsa
Calligraphers of Arabic script
19th-century calligraphers
All stub articles
Sufi artists
1790 births